RBF may refer to:

 Big Bear City Airport, California, IATA code RBF
 Radial basis function in numerical analysis
 Radial basis function kernel, also called RBF kernel
 Random Block File, the OS-9 file system
 Rangierbahnhof, a railway marshalling yard in Germany, abbreviated Rbf.
 Rassemblement Bruxelles-France, a minor Belgian political party
 Rat-bite fever, an illness acquired from rodents
 Reel Big Fish, a ska-punk band
 Renal blood flow, the rate of blood flow to the kidneys
 Replace-by-Fee, a way to resend a Bitcoin transaction with higher fees in order to get it mined quicker
 Reserve Bank of Fiji, the central bank of Fiji
 Restaurant Trade Union, a former trade union in Denmark
 Resting bitch face, an unintentionally annoyed-looking facial expression
 Revenue Based Financing, capital for growing businesses
 Riboflavin, a vitamin, may be abbreviated to Rbf or RBF
 Rockefeller Brothers Fund, a philanthropic vehicle of the Rockefellers
 Round-bottom flask, a common piece of laboratory glassware
 Rubidium fluoride, chemical formula RbF
 Russian Basketball Federation